Andreas Hofer (1767–1810) was a Tyrolean innkeeper and patriot.

Andreas Hofer may also refer to:

People
Andreas Hofer (composer) (1629–1684), German composer
Andreas Hofer (actor) (born 1962), German actor
Andreas Hofer (cyclist) (born 1991), Austrian cyclist 
Andy Hope 1930 (born 1963), German painter

Other
Andreas Hofer (film), a 1929 German silent historical film

Hofer, Andreas